Major-General Andrew Cracroft Becher  (26 August 1858 – 11 May 1929) was a senior British Army officer.

Military career
Educated at Rugby School, Becher was commissioned into the Royal Scots on 30 January 1878. After service with the Norfolk Regiment in South Africa, he became commander of the 2nd Lothian Volunteer Infantry Brigade in March 1907 and commander of the Durham Light Infantry Brigade in 1908. He went on to be General Officer Commanding 63rd (2nd Northumbrian) Division in 1914 and commander of the Southern Command Depot in Sutton Coldfield in 1916.

Family
In 1883 he married Frances Maude Johnson; they had one son and two daughters. Following the death of his first wife he married Elisabeth Dalyell Stewart in 1907; they had three sons.

References

1858 births
1929 deaths
Graduates of the Royal Military College, Sandhurst
British Army personnel of the Second Boer War
British Army major generals
Military personnel from Sussex
British Army generals of World War I
Commanders of the Order of the British Empire
Royal Scots officers
People educated at Rugby School